Downderry  is a coastal village in southeast Cornwall, England, United Kingdom.

Downderry has a long beach of light shingle. There is road access down to the beach via a slipway although this is blocked by a locked gate, pedestrian access is still possible. Dogs are allowed on the beach. The beach further east is a nudist beach.

The village has a Church of England church, a Methodist chapel, a shop with a post office, a pub, a restaurant, a coffee shop and a primary school.

The Church of St Nicolas Downderry began as a mission church to service the growing population of the village.  The building dates from the late 19th century.

Points of interest

Bass rock

Coleadon
 further on from Bass Rock are the cliffs of Coleadon, the promontory past these cliffs means access to the beach past this point is cut off at high tide.

The Long Stone (Shag Rock)

Past Coleadon is a  stretch of beach which ends in a rocky outcrop known locally as "Shag Rock" after the seabirds who can be seen sitting on the rock drying their wings after diving for fish. This marks the end of easy foot access to the coastline. There is a path up the cliff which leads to the road above this beach, the climb is pleasant but reasonably strenuous. The ruins of an old Victorian lodge, known as "St Germans Hut", can be found halfway up this cliff path.

Television transmitter
On one of the hills above the village is a television transmitter which serves as a repeater for the local area.

Chain Home bunkers
During the Second World War Downderry was the site of a Chain Home radar installation. The remains of this installation are present and can be found on the East side of the village. One of the bunkers has been converted into a residential garage, the other is no longer accessible from the road as it is now private property.

Neolithic earthworks
The only known example of a 'cursus' earthwork in Cornwall is situated behind the village in the fields near Triffle farm.

Wreck of the Gipsy

Originally named 'The Rodney' she was an iron full-rigged ship built in 1874 by W. Pile & Co., Sunderland.

In Nov. 1895, Rodney lost her figurehead in a gale in the English Channel, while en route from Gravesend, Kent to Sydney. The figurehead washed ashore at Whitsand Bay, Cornwall, six months later.

In 1897, the ship was sold to F. Boissière, of Nantes, France, and renamed Gipsy (the cross-over year, per Lloyd's, is 1896/97). Re-rigged then as a Barque. On Dec. 7, 1901, the vessel was wrecked, a total loss, at Downderry on the return voyage from Iquique (Chile) to France with a cargo of nitrate. The  ship lost her bearings and became stranded on the reef. She was blown apart by explosives as she had become a hazard to local fishing vessels.

Artistic impression

References

External links

Villages in Cornwall
Populated coastal places in Cornwall
Nude beaches